Thongloun Sisoulith (born 10 November 1945) is a Lao historian and politician serving as General Secretary of the Lao People's Revolutionary Party since 15 January 2021 and President of Laos since 22 March 2021.

Life and career

Sisoulith was born in the Houaphan province of Laos, and he studied at Pedagogical College of Neo Lao Hak Sat in Houaphan from 1962 to 1969. He was further educated in the Soviet Union and Vietnam. In addition to Lao, he speaks Vietnamese, Russian and English.

Throughout his years in government, he has an extensive list of appointments. He was Deputy Minister of Foreign Affairs from 1987 to 1992, Minister of Labour and Social Welfare from 1993 to 1997, and a member of the National Assembly from 1998 to 2000. He became Deputy Prime Minister and President of the State Planning Committee on 27 March 2001, and he was additionally appointed as Foreign Minister on 8 June 2006, replacing Somsavat Lengsavad. He was chosen to become Prime Minister of Laos at the 10th Party Congress on 23 January 2016.

At the 11th National Congress of the Lao People's Revolutionary Party in 2021, he was elected the party's general secretary, and hence de facto leader of Laos, the first civilian with no military background to be general secretary.

Awards 
 Order of José Martí (Cuba)
 Gold Star Order (Vietnam)
 Ho Chi Minh Order (Vietnam)
 Knight of the Great Ribbon of the Order of the White Elephant (Thailand)
 Grand Cross of the Order of the Southern Cross (Brazil)
 Gold Medalle of the Russian Peace Foundation "For Peacekeeping and Charitable Activities" (5 October 2015, Russia)
 Order of Friendship (20 October 2015, Russia)

References

External links

World Economic forum biography
United Nations biography

|-

|-

1945 births
Living people
Heads of the Central Committee of the Lao People's Revolutionary Party
Members of the 4th Central Committee of the Lao People's Revolutionary Party
Members of the 5th Central Committee of the Lao People's Revolutionary Party
Members of the 6th Central Committee of the Lao People's Revolutionary Party
Members of the 7th Central Committee of the Lao People's Revolutionary Party
Members of the 8th Central Committee of the Lao People's Revolutionary Party
Members of the 9th Central Committee of the Lao People's Revolutionary Party
Members of the 10th Central Committee of the Lao People's Revolutionary Party
Members of the 11th Central Committee of the Lao People's Revolutionary Party
Members of the 7th Politburo of the Lao People's Revolutionary Party
Members of the 8th Politburo of the Lao People's Revolutionary Party
Members of the 9th Politburo of the Lao People's Revolutionary Party
Members of the 10th Politburo of the Lao People's Revolutionary Party
Members of the 11th Politburo of the Lao People's Revolutionary Party
Members of the 11th Secretariat of the Lao People's Revolutionary Party
Lao People's Revolutionary Party politicians
Members of the National Assembly of Laos
People from Houaphanh province
Deputy Prime Ministers of Laos
Prime Ministers of Laos
Foreign ministers of Laos
Labor ministers of Laos
Social affairs ministers of Laos
Herzen University alumni